The Bunica is a short river in Bosnia and Herzegovina and a left bank tributary of the Buna. Its source (Vrelo Bunice), located in a place called Parila under sharp cliffs between the two villages of Hodbina and Malo Polje, is 14 km south from Mostar. It is a very deep and strong karstic spring and difficult to access. Together with the Buna river, it flows west for approximately 10 km and joins the Neretva river near Buna village. The Bunica is a main tributary of the Buna.

See also
 Blagaj, Mostar
 Krupa (Neretva)
 Hutovo Blato
 Vrelo Bune

Rivers of Bosnia and Herzegovina
Karst springs of Bosnia and Herzegovina
Landforms of the Federation of Bosnia and Herzegovina
b
Upper Horizons Hydroelectric Power Stations System